The ninth season of Cheers, an American television sitcom, originally aired on NBC in the United States between September 20, 1990, and May 3, 1991. The show was created by director James Burrows and writers Glen and Les Charles under production team Charles Burrows Charles Productions, in association with Paramount Television.

Background
Cheers is a sitcom that started in 1982. Though it experienced early low ratings, the show became a part of mainstream culture. The sitcom is set in a Boston bar originally owned by Sam Malone, a retired baseball pitcher, but Sam sells the bar at the start of Season 6. Waitress Carla Tortelli, bartender Woody Boyd and manager Rebecca Howe, work at the bar and serve regular patrons Norm Peterson, Cliff Clavin and Frasier Crane. The show was a key part of NBC's "Must See TV" Thursday night lineup.

Cast and characters
Ted Danson as Sam Malone
Kirstie Alley as Rebecca Howe
Rhea Perlman as Carla Tortelli
John Ratzenberger as Cliff Clavin
Woody Harrelson as Woody Boyd
Kelsey Grammer as Frasier Crane
George Wendt as Norm Peterson	

Recurring characters
Bebe Neuwirth as Lilith Sternin-Crane
Jackie Swanson as Kelly Gaines
Roger Rees as Robin Colcord

Episodes

Accolades
In the 43rd Primetime Emmy Awards (1991), this season won four Emmys: Outstanding Comedy Series of 1990–1991, Outstanding Lead Actress in a Comedy Series (Kirstie Alley), Outstanding Supporting Actress in a Comedy Series (Bebe Neuwirth), and Outstanding Directing for a Comedy Series (James Burrows).

References

9
1990 American television seasons
1991 American television seasons